Songsak Chaisamak, born July 10, 1983, is a Thai retired professional footballer.

Clubs

Thai Port FC    - 2009
Buriram PEA - 2010
Udon Thani - 2012

Honours
 2010 Regional League Division 2 Champions With Buriram FC
 2011 Thai Division 1 League Champions With Buriram FC

References

 Player Profile on 7M
 Player Profile on Thai Premier League
 Footballer.in.th

External links
 Thai Port FC Official Website
 2009 Profile

Songsak Chaisamak
Songsak Chaisamak
Songsak Chaisamak
Songsak Chaisamak
1983 births
Living people
Association football defenders
Songsak Chaisamak